Rossport is a dispersed rural community and unincorporated place in the Unorganized part of Thunder Bay District in northwestern Ontario, Canada. It is on the north shore of Lake Superior in geographic Lahontan Township, and is on Ontario Highway 17. Rossport is a designated place served by a local services board, and has a population of 65.

History
Rossport is named after John Ross (c1820-1898), construction manager for the north shore of Lake Superior route of the Canadian Pacific Railway from August 1882 to June 1885. His construction headquarters during that time period were in Port Arthur, Ontario and at Rossport, then known as McKay's Harbour.

McKay's Harbour was named after Alexander McKay who operated a small fur trading post at Pays Plat and his son, Charles McKay, who was a lighthouse keeper at nearby Battle Island from 1878-1913.

After the end of CPR construction in 1885, Rossport became an important commercial fishing centre. Bowman Street is named after John Bowman (1858–1950) who operated a fishing company there.

Tiny Rossport garnered a wide reputation for being a source of prime fish. An article in the Dominion Illustrated from October 1888, speaks of how dealers from Eastern Canada had travelled to Rossport and other North Shore communities in order to contract for Lake Superior’s fine freshwater fish. Another article from November 1888 talks of a trial shipment of ten barrels of fish from Rossport being sent to Belfast Ireland, where it was quickly sold.

In 1901, Rossport joined other North Shore port communities in becoming a regular stop for steamships belonging to Francis Clergue. The vessels operated between Sault Ste Marie and Port Arthur.

In 1907, tenders were called by the Dominion Public Works Department for the construction of a wharf at Rossport.

Most interesting is how a small local competition in 1937 morphed into an international event. There was a time when the Rossport Fish Derby was a staple on every sports fisherman's calendar. An August 1952 article in the Toronto Star describes over 4000 people attending that year’s self-proclaimed “greatest amateur fishing event in North America”. Cars, tents and people would be visible along the highway for a distance as participants arrived and staked out a piece of land to camp on for the one-day event. The arrival to the Lake of a non-native species, the Lamprey eel, caused devastation to the Lake trout population and, over time, brought about the downfall to the days of the derby.

In 1911 the luxury steam yacht Gunilda, owned by William L. Harkness, foundered on the McGarvey Shoal and sank 8 kilometres from Rossport. The actual date of the sinking varies from August 11 to August 29 to August 31st depending upon the article. A Toronto Daily Star news item contained in the Friday, September 1, 1911 edition states that the vessel ran aground on Wednesday, which would be August 30, and then refers to the sinking as occurring "yesterday" or August 31, 1911. This timeframe could reflect accuracy as after the vessel ran aground on the shoal and stabilized, a small boat was sent to Rossport where arrangements were made for the dispatch of a rescue tug from Port Arthur. It would take time for that tug to travel to Rossport. Therefore there would be a difference in the time between when the Gunilda ran aground and when it was actually pulled off the shoal only to sink.

Painters from the Group of Seven (artists) visited Rossport and the surrounding area several times in the 1920s. In 2018, a plaque was installed in Wardrop Park celebrating their visits and Lawren Harris' painting "Rossport, Lake Superior - 1921" as part of the Moments of Algoma tourism initiative.

On October 3, 1933, Rossport's waterfront suffered great damage as a result of an unusual tidal phenomenon with Lake Superior.

Demographics 

Local government
Rossport is managed by a local services board. Rossport has a water treatment plant which serves 45 households. The hamlet falls within the provincial and federal ridings of Thunder Bay-Superior North.

Recreation and Environment
The Lake Superior National Marine Conservation Area, which includes the waters off Rossport, was created by Parks Canada on June 24, 2015.

In 2009, an eight-island archipelago just off Rossport, including Wilson Island, was purchased from private owners and was to become a Canadian federal natural area under a joint deal backed by the Nature Conservancy of Canada, the Government of Canada and the Government of Ontario, and supported by the Pays Plat First Nation.

The Voyageur Hiking Trail passes through the town.

Demographics
Rossport had a population of 66 in the Canada 2006 Census, a decrease of 41.1% since 2001, but only dropped to 65 persons in the 2011 census.

References

Other map sources:

External links

Video on the Gunilda
Gunilda-Drowning in Dreams

Communities in Thunder Bay District
Designated places in Ontario
Local services boards in Ontario
Populated places on Lake Superior in Canada